Key Publishing is a magazine publishing company specialising in aviation titles, based in Stamford, Lincolnshire, England.

History
Airliner World was launched in 1999. In 2005 it launched Airports of the World, and in the same year it bought PC Pilot (originally launched in 1999), the world's best selling flight simulation magazine.

In October 2009, Key Publishing bought Spain's leading aviation magazine Avion Revue, and its Latin American (Mexico and Argentina) editions, formerly owned by Motor Presse - Ibérica (a division of Europe's largest publishing firm - Gruner + Jahr). This magazine, along with Avion & Piloto, is published by Key Publishing Spain.

In March 2010, it bought the title Aviation News. Aviation News is Britain's longest established monthly aviation journal. Airfix Model World launched on 4 November 2010, in partnership with Airfix.

In March 2012, Key Publishing acquired several magazines previously published by Ian Allan Publishing. Titles included Modern Railways, Railways Illustrated, Vintage Roadscene, Hornby Magazine, Combat Aircraft, Classic Aircraft, and Buses.

Products
As well as its core titles, it produces one-off titles for organisations such as the Royal Air Force. It produces the directories for the Society of British Aircraft Companies and the British Aviation Group. It produces the souvenir programme for the Farnborough Airshow.

Titles

The following are publications of Key Publishing:

Websites
Key.Aero
Key Model World
AirForces Daily
AirForces Intelligence
Key Shop

Structure
It is sited on the A6121 in the very north of Stamford, not far from the former Stamford branch of the Great Northern Railway and the River Gwash (a tributary of the River Welland).

References

External links
 
 Special publications (one-offs)
 Aviation forums
 AirForces Intelligence
 Key Aero

1980 establishments in England
Companies based in Stamford, Lincolnshire
Publishing companies established in 1980
Magazine publishing companies of the United Kingdom
Mass media in Lincolnshire
Publishing companies of the United Kingdom
South Kesteven District